Erigeron aurantiacus  is an Asian species of flowering plants in the family Asteraceae. It is native to Kazakhstan and Xinjiang in central Asia.

Erigeron aurantiacus  is a perennial, clump-forming herb up to 35 cm (14 inches) tall. Its flower heads have orange, yellow, or deep red ray florets and yellow disc florets.

References

aurantiacus
Flora of Kazakhstan
Flora of Xinjiang
Plants described in 1879